Mort the Dead Teenager is the name of a limited series published by Marvel Comics. The comic centered on the titular Mort who dies while street racing and returns as an undead being who is tormented by both the living and the dead. Despite its offbeat humor and bizarre scenario, it has been designated as officially being part of the Marvel Universe.

Publication history
The comic ran for four issues from December 1993 to March 1994. The comic written by Larry Hama while all the art was handled Gary Hallgren.

Plot
Mort Graves is a loser teenager from Mistake Beach, Long Island, New York. He tries to impress his crush Kimberly Dimenmein by racing against her boyfriend Lance Boyle in a broken down Studebaker. While doing so, he gets struck and beheaded by an oncoming train and ends up in the afterlife where he meets Teen Death, the son of the actual Death. Hell is already full and Heaven is closed for repairs. With no other choice, Mort is sent back to the living where he is now an undead being and discovers that his family is in "mourning" for him (actually more concerned with other things relating to his death). To Mort's pleasure, Kimberly seems genuinely saddened at Mort's death while Maureen, a tough motorcycle riding teen, accuses her of not caring about him prior. Mort fails to realize that Maureen clearly had feelings for him though his friends, Slick and Weirdo think it is obvious. After another argument with his family, Mort attends Slick and Weirdo's band tryouts and are quickly joined by Kimberly and Maureen. Jealous of the chemistry between them, Mort attempts to sabotage their equipment, but Weirdo's dad loves their new sound and makes himself their manager, much to Mort's chagrin.

The band, Positive Feedback, go to a major club to perform with Mort following along. While in the bathroom, Mort once again gets dragged back by Teen Death who tells him that he needs to start haunting people again or he will be left in purgatory. The group get on stage to perform with Mort creating a wide variety of effects, only to realize they were playing to an empty house. After coming home, Mort confronts Teen Death who tells him different outcomes if he had not died. One has him getting a menial job at a car wash and getting killed in an upcoming war with Canada. Another has him marry an overweight Kimberly while still working the car wash while all of his friends become successful. The last one has him quitting his car wash job to travel the world where he gets a bag of gold and buys a race car, only for aliens to attack. He returns to the present where his family still act like jerks, Weirdo has become homeless, Slick gets into science fan fiction, Maureen changes her style and starts dating Lance and Kimberly runs away to become a beat poet. Mort awakens to realize the whole ordeal was a dream and is alive again. However, Mort seems destined for failure as he leaves to relive the incident that started it all.

Characters
Mort Graves – An inept and loser teenager who gets beheaded by a train in a racing accident. It seems that before his death, he already had a pathetic life. After his death, his life is actually much worse with his family being totally indifferent to his predicament. He has a crush on Kimberly and is oblivious to Maureen's clear feelings for him. As an undead teen, he has the ability to detach his head and can float and make himself invisible. He also seems to have the ability to affect electronic equipment.
Kimberly Dimenmein – A beautiful blond teen who is admired by Mort. She is into poetry and singing and despite showing no interest in Mort prior to his death, openly showed sadness when he passed.
Maureen Redding – A tough biker girl who showed an interest in Mort. After his death, she was noticeably distraught. She dislikes Kimberly, but nevertheless was willing to play alongside her when she joined Slick and Weirdo's band.
Teen Death – The son of the actual death who takes dumb teens who died in ridiculous predicaments. He loves his job and apparently likes to torment Mort. Despite this, he has admitted that he does care for him to some degree.
Lance Boyle – Kimberly's handsome jock boyfriend.
George "Slick" Slickowski – One of Mort's friends. He is a tall lanky boy with long hair.
Reardon "Weirdo" Weedlow – One of Mort's friends. He is a short stout boy with a half shaved head and sunglasses.
Bruce Graves – Mort's father who seems more concerned with the state his Studebaker.
Wendy Graves – Mort's mother who is upset about how things have been going for the family.
Kyle Graves – Mort's younger brother who is an expert in finances and wants his brother's room.
Cyndi Graves – Mort's older sister who uses Mort's death as a way to pick up boys.

Film adaptation
A film version of Mort the Dead Teenager had been in development since 2002. Robert Zemeckis and Steven Spielberg were attached to produce with Jim Cooper writing the script. Elijah Wood was in talks for the starring role of Mort and Dominique Swain as his love interest. Production had switched around with Quentin Tarantino replacing Spielberg and Zemeckis and Dean Paraskevopoulos hired to direct. Jessica Simpson was reportedly cast as Mort's love interest a year later. As of 2021, the film has not been made and it is assumed to have been shelved.

References

External links
Mort the Dead Teenager on the Marvel Wiki

1993 comics debuts
1994 comics endings
Marvel Comics limited series
Defunct American comics
Characters created by Larry Hama
Fiction about purgatory